Phetkasem 48 station is a Bangkok MRT rapid transit station on the Blue Line, located above Phet Kasem Road located in Bangkok, Thailand.

The station is located close to Soi Phet Kasem 48 on Phet Kasem Road inbound, a large and deep alley, including a shortcut to Soi Charan Sanitwong 13 on Charan Sanitwong Road where Charan 13 MRT station is located.

Nearby places
Wat Chan Pradittharam
Chao Pho Sua Shrine
Kan-Ari Sportclub

References 

 This article incorporates material from the corresponding article in the Thai Wikipedia.

MRT (Bangkok) stations
2019 establishments in Thailand
Railway stations opened in 2019